Glomus (Latin for 'ball of thread or yarn') can refer to:
 Glomus (fungus)
 Glomus tumor
 Coccygeal glomus
 Carotid glomus, another name for the carotid body
 Glomus cell
 Glomerulus, an anatomical term meaning "small ball"